The Notre Dame–USC football rivalry is an American college football rivalry between the Notre Dame Fighting Irish football team of the University of Notre Dame and USC Trojans football team of the University of Southern California, customarily played on the Saturday following Thanksgiving Day when the game is in Los Angeles or on the second or third Saturday of October when the game is in South Bend, Indiana.

The rivalry began in 1926 and is considered one of the fiercest in college football. The rivalry game has been played every year from 1926 to the present, with the exception of 1943–1945 when the game was cancelled during World War II and in 2020 when the Pac-12 Conference cancelled all non-conference games in response to the COVID-19 pandemic. The pandemic therefore interrupted a streak of 73 consecutive years in which the game had been played. The 2021 matchup marked the first time in series history that two consecutive games between the rivals were played in South Bend, although the games were not played in consecutive years.

Notre Dame and USC have been among most successful programs in college football, with the schools having won a combined 24 national championships and 14 Heisman Trophies through the 2021 season. Moreover, both schools have fielded a high number of Consensus All-Americans (102 for Notre Dame—the most in college football—and 82 for USC), College Football Hall of Famers (46 from Notre Dame and 43 from USC), and Pro Football Hall of Famers (13 from each). The rivals account for the highest numbers of players selected in the NFL Draft of any school; Notre Dame has had 546 players taken, and USC has had 530. No rivalry in college football accounts for as many combined honors.

The teams play for the Jeweled Shillelagh, a trophy that goes home with the winning team each year. Notre Dame leads the all-time series 48–36–5 and also leads 33–29–3 since the introduction of the trophy. Despite many close games, the series has seen dominant runs by both sides: USC went 12–2–2 from 1967 through 1982, Notre Dame went undefeated (11–0–1) from 1983 through 1995, and USC went undefeated (8–0) from 2002 through 2009. However, while Notre Dame and USC have defeated the other in landmark games enabling one of them to move on to a national title, the two teams have also played spoiler to each other several times:

Notre Dame – #1 undefeated Notre Dame beat #2 undefeated USC in the Coliseum en route to the national title in 1988. The Irish also spoiled Trojan title campaigns by giving them their first loss in the last game of the season in 1947 and 1952, as well as handing them a first loss in 1927, 1973 and 1995. They also tied #1 ranked USC in 1968, 21–21, knocking them down to #2 behind Ohio State (who then beat USC in a 1 vs. 2 matchup in the Rose Bowl).  The Irish tied the Trojans again in 1969, 14–14, the only blemish in USC's 10–0–1 season.

USC – Spoiled legitimate Irish title hopes in 1938, 1964, 1970, 1980, and tied them in 1948 (after Michigan already had been voted #1 by the AP Poll). Each game came in the final week of the season. USC also spoiled Irish campaigns in 1931 and 1971.

Although the game is played in Los Angeles in even numbered years, it is not part of Fox's Pac-12 Conference football package. Instead, the game, like most of Notre Dame's away games, is broadcast on ABC through ESPN on ABC. In odd-numbered years, when the game is played in South Bend, it is broadcast on NBC as part of its coverage of Notre Dame's home schedule.

Series history

Origins

Conversation between wives
The origin of the series is quite often recounted as a "conversation between wives" of Notre Dame head coach Knute Rockne and USC athletic director Gywnn Wilson. In fact, many sports writers often cite this popular story as the main reason the two schools decided to play one another. As the story goes, the rivalry began with USC looking for a national rival. USC dispatched Wilson and his wife to Lincoln, Nebraska, where Notre Dame was playing Nebraska on Thanksgiving Day. On that day (Nebraska 17, Notre Dame 0) Knute Rockne resisted the idea of a home-and-home series with USC because of the travel involved, but Mrs. Wilson was able to persuade Mrs. Rockne that a trip every two years to sunny Southern California was better than one to snowy, hostile Nebraska. Mrs. Rockne spoke to her husband and on December 4, 1926, USC became an annual fixture on Notre Dame's schedule.

Another tale
While the "wives story" remains the classic explanation for starting the series, college football historian Murray Sperber, who in researching his book on the early days of Notre Dame football, Shake Down the Thunder, uncovered a different explanation for the creation of the series that somewhat contradicts the story. Sperber documents that the series was created primarily for financial and political reasons, and that Rockne's resistance to the series is misstated. During the 1920s, many college institutions, including the Big Ten (then called the Western Conference), sought to combat the commercialism that was steadily increasing in college athletics. Part of the concern over commercialism stemmed from the large money payouts teams would receive by traveling long distances to play in bowl games.

Meanwhile, Notre Dame had difficulty scheduling local Western Conference opponents because of a ban placed on member schools from playing them. The Irish were initially forced to seek out opponents nationally to fill its schedule, often traveling far away to do so. After the Irish started winning landmark games against elite teams, such as Georgia Tech and Army, the team started to grow in popularity and could command more money for games it scheduled. Notre Dame garnered interest from the Rose Bowl Committee to have Notre Dame come and play a Pacific Coast Conference (now Pac-12) opponent for the 1924 football season. Coach Rockne and the Notre Dame administration realized how lucrative an annual trip to Los Angeles would be for the football program. Notre Dame's West Coast alumni began lobbying Rockne to bring the team to the Rose Bowl as a season finale every year. The Rose Bowl Committee favored this arrangement (at the time there was no tie in with the Big Ten); however, the Pacific Coast Conference had reservations. Specifically, two members schools, Stanford and California refused to play Notre Dame "on account of [Notre Dame's] low scholastic standards." Since Notre Dame was a Catholic school, its academics were considered inferior at the time. USC's coach, Gus Henderson reached out to Rockne through correspondence stating that "USC would welcome the chance to play Notre Dame New Year's Day in Pasadena." While Rockne favored playing USC, Stanford, which won the Pacific Coast Conference title, had first choice and eventually realized that playing Notre Dame would be lucrative, and the two played in the 1925 Rose Bowl.

The series between Notre Dame and USC was created because of the still-existing desire for Notre Dame to travel to Los Angeles to please its alums and earn a large payout, as well as the still-standing invitation to play them from Coach Henderson. While the creation of the series was contradictory to Notre Dame's efforts to follow the Big Ten in combating commercialism (the Big Ten had a 26-year Bowl ban, which Notre Dame followed even longer), Rockne and other administrators justified the game since it was created as a home-and-home series, only to be played in Los Angeles every other year. The creation of the series was also likely influenced by the hiring of Howard Jones, who knew Rockne from coaching against him at Iowa.  To the priests who ran Notre Dame, playing USC in Los Angeles every other year was preferable to making further trips to the Rose Bowl game.  Notre Dame would not play in another bowl game until the 1970 Cotton Bowl.

Knute Rockne–Howard Jones connection
Another factor in the creation of the series is the connection between both schools' coaches, Knute Rockne and Howard Jones. Following Notre Dame's 1924 championship season, Rockne was approached by USC to take over its football program. Rockne would often entertain such advances and let the news slip out to the Notre Dame administration in order to get a raise and bolster his position internally and nationally. While Rockne ultimately turned down the offer, he recommended that USC look at his friend Howard Jones, whom he knew from taking his Notre Dame teams to play Iowa. Barry LeBrock, author of The Trojan Ten, also confirms that Rockne lent the Trojans a helping hand in recommending that they consider hiring Iowa's coach Howard Jones, after USC fired "Gloomy Gus" Henderson. The creation of the series was likely influenced by their friendship, and by Jones' desire to take USC to Notre Dame's elite level.

The early years: 1926–1940s
Notre Dame and USC played their first game in 1926, a 13–12 win for the Irish. Rockne was quoted as saying it was the greatest game he ever saw. The following year, Notre Dame and USC would play a memorable game at Soldier Field in Chicago, a slim 7–6 Irish victory. An estimated 120,000 people were in attendance, a crowd that is considered to be one of the largest attended games in NCAA history. USC's first win in the series also came during the same year they won their first national title in 1928. From 1928 to 1932, USC and Notre Dame combined to win the national title five straight years, with USC winning in 1928, 1931, and 1932, and Notre Dame winning in 1929 and 1930. During this period, there was some talk of canceling the series due to the long amount of travel time it took by train from South Bend to Los Angeles. Rockne argued for the series against the Notre Dame faculty board and its chair, Father Michael Mulcaire, countering that "he saw the day coming when most college teams will be going by air exclusively."

Notable Games:

1929 – Notre Dame 13, USC 12  This game played at Soldier field has the second largest verified attendance in the history of NCAA football at 112,912.

1930 – Notre Dame 27, USC 0  Notre Dame won its second consecutive national championship (and third overall) and 19th straight game in what turned out to be the last regular season game under coach Knute Rockne.

1931 – USC 16, Notre Dame 14  More than 300,000 fans welcomed the Trojans home from this thrilling victory in South Bend — a victory clinched by what sportswriter Maxwell Stiles called "Johnny Baker's 10 little toes and three BIG points." After trailing 14–0, USC won the game with a Johnny Baker 33-yard field goal with one minute remaining. The win snapped Notre Dame's 26-game unbeaten string and was the Trojans' first win in South Bend. Called "the biggest upset since Mrs. O'Leary's cow knocked over that lantern" by El Rodeo, USC's student yearbook, it clinched USC's second national title. Sports historians cite this come-from-behind victory with Jones as coach that prompted the school from the West to catapult into the same elite circle with ND.

1932 – USC 13, Notre Dame 0  USC shut out Notre Dame on its way to a second consecutive consensus national title, matching Notre Dame's feat in 1929 and 1930.

1938 – USC 13, Notre Dame 0  Notre Dame entered the game ranked No. 1 in the scheduled final AP Poll, released in late November prior to the game. Following their loss, the AP poll was extended for one week due to the "select quality of last Saturday's games, three of which had a direct bearing on the ranking." USC's win dropped the Irish to No. 5 and out of AP national championship consideration.

1940s–1950s
The 1940s were good for the Irish, which earned national titles in 1943, 1946, 1947, and 1949. Meanwhile, USC was fielding competitive teams, but none that achieved national championship status. Still, this era provided some memorable games, with USC playing spoiler to the Irish in 1948.

Notable Games:

1938 – USC 13, Notre Dame 0  Played at the Los Angeles Memorial Coliseum, Notre Dame was undefeated and ranked #1 in the nation. USC was ranked 8th with a 7–2 record. Notre Dame fell to a #5 ranking the following week, but were still named national champions by the Dickinson System.

1947 – Notre Dame 38, USC 7  104,953 were on hand, the highest attendance for a football game in the Coliseum, to see 7–0–1 Rose Bowl-bound USC lose to 8–0 Notre Dame 38–7. Notre Dame was awarded the AP National Championship. USC would lose to Michigan 49–0 in the Rose Bowl, leading Michigan to also claim a national championship.

1948 – USC 14, Notre Dame 14  The Irish were undefeated and untied riding a 21-game winning streak, before this game on December 2.

1950 – USC 9, Notre Dame 7  USC's 300th victory in a dismal 4–4–1 season for the Irish, their worst under coach Frank Leahy.

1954 – Notre Dame 23, USC 17  Notre Dame quarterback Ralph Guglielmi throws a 72-yard pass to Jim Morse with 5:52 remaining for the win.

1959 – Notre Dame 16, USC 6  This was the last game played between the two teams in South Bend in November. Athletic Director Jess Hill proposed moving USC's games at Notre Dame Stadium to October, while continuing to play the Coliseum games in late November, to which Notre Dame agreed.

1960s–1982
The 1960s–1982 period is considered by most fans to be the golden age of the rivalry, as Notre Dame and USC combined to win eight national titles. Notre Dame won national titles in the 1966, 1973, and 1977 seasons; USC won titles in 1962, 1967, 1972, 1974, and 1978. USC also played spoiler to Notre Dame in the 1964 season, costing them a chance at the national title. The rivalry was equally intense between USC coach John McKay and Notre Dame coach Ara Parseghian.

Notable Games:

1960 – Notre Dame 17, USC 0  Notre Dame was 1–8 coming into this game, having lost eight straight games, a school record that still stands.  The Trojans, under rookie coach John McKay, finished 4–6.

1961 – Notre Dame 30, USC 0  The Irish improved to 3–0 for the season in notching their fifth straight win against the Trojans in dominating fashion in the first meeting between the two rivals played in October.  USC ended up with zero net rushing yards as their quarterbacks were sacked repeatedly.  It was the largest margin of victory for a Joe Kuharich-coached Notre Dame team and in the process, Kuharich became the only Irish coach to date to post back-to-back shutouts over USC.

1962 – USC 25, Notre Dame 0  USC was undefeated and ranked #1 in the nation while Notre Dame was 5–4, having won four straight.  The Trojans would be voted national champions after this game and would go on to outlast Wisconsin in a wild Rose Bowl victory, while Irish coach Joe Kuharich would resign the following spring.

1963 – Notre Dame 17, USC 14  Ken Ivan's fourth-quarter field goal proved to be the difference as the Irish avoided an 0–3 start by knocking off the defending national champions.  Notre Dame won only one more game all season long, a 27–12 victory over UCLA the following week, and finished a dismal 2–7 under interim head coach Hugh Devore.

1964 – USC 20, Notre Dame 17  Notre Dame was ranked #1, undefeated and an 11-point favorite going into the game at USC's Los Angeles Memorial Coliseum. Ara Parseghian, Notre Dame's first-year head coach, was in the midst of a huge Irish turnaround at 9–0, after ND went 2–7 the previous year. USC was unranked and was 6–3 on the season. Star quarterback and eventual Heisman winner John Huarte directed the Irish to a 17–0 lead at halftime. That lead would evaporate, however, as the Trojans, aided at least twice on critical plays late in the game by highly questionable officiating, took a 20–17 lead on a fourth-down pass from Trojan quarterback Craig Fertig to wide receiver Rod Sherman with 1:35 remaining.  The first dubious call came as Notre Dame scored a touchdown in the second half on a one-yard dive by Joe Kantor. But an official called holding on tackle Bob Meeker and the score was nullified.  Video clearly shows that Meeker actually lunged forward into the end zone and fell onto the ground, holding nothing except turf.  Nevertheless, that error kept the Irish from extending their lead.  The unequivocally game changing call came on USC's last touchdown drive when Fertig was hit and either threw or fumbled the ball backwards and it was recovered by ND.  Inexplicably the officials ruled that this was an incomplete pass, despite it being "thrown" in the direction of no eligible receiver. Notre Dame put together a last-minute drive, and with six seconds left, Huarte threw a pass to receiver Jack Snow that was broken up in the end zone. The Irish's hopes of a national title were stolen; the Trojans' bid for the Rose Bowl berth also fell short despite the upset. Notre Dame fell to number 3 in the ranking the following week, but were still awarded the MacArthur Bowl.

1965 – Notre Dame 28, USC 7  USC came into this game undefeated while the Irish were 3–1.  Heisman Trophy winner Mike Garrett was held to 43 yards rushing as the Irish avenged their 20–17 loss the previous season.  Fullback Larry Conjar scored all four Irish touchdowns and rushed for 116 yards. It was Ara Parseghian's only win against the Trojans to not come during a national title year for the Irish.

1966 – Notre Dame 51, USC 0  Undefeated Notre Dame, following its controversial 10–10 tie with Michigan State, routed the Trojans, 51–0, earning Notre Dame the number one ranking. Backup quarterback Coley O'Brien, who came off the bench the previous week after Terry Hanratty was injured, made the most of his only collegiate start, completing 21 of 31 passes for 255 yards and three touchdowns.  Tom Schoen and Dave Martin each returned interceptions for touchdowns.  It was and still stands as the worst defeat in Trojan history and until 2009 it was one of only two times the Trojans had given up 50 points in a game. (USC lost to Cal 52–30 in 1991)  Supposedly McKay vowed never to lose to Notre Dame again after that game, although he denied ever making such a statement.  He did, however, say the Trojans would never lose again by a score of 51–0.

1967 – USC 24, Notre Dame 7  Coming off the previous year's worst lost in its history, the Trojans came into the game ranked number 1 in the polls, although Notre Dame was a heavy favorite. The win marked USC's first win in South Bend since 1939, behind the running of tailback O. J. Simpson, the junior college transfer from San Francisco. Simpson rushed for 160 yards on 38 carries and scored all three USC touchdowns after Notre Dame led at halftime, 7–0. The victory solidified USC's place at the top of the final rankings.

1968 – Notre Dame 21, USC 21  USC came into the game undefeated and ranked number 1 in the nation behind the running of eventual Heisman Trophy winner O. J. Simpson, while the Irish were 7–2.  The game was one of the most widely viewed in college football history with a 22.9 rating, surpassing even the 1966 Notre Dame match-up with Michigan State. Joe Theismann started at quarterback in place of the injured Terry Hanratty, and on the second play of the game, he threw an interception that Sandy Durko returned for a touchdown and a quick 7–0 lead for the Trojans. But Theismann didn't let that bother him and by halftime had staked the Irish to a 21–7 lead, the third touchdown coming on a halfback-to-quarterback option pass by Coley O'Brien. The Trojans scored twice in the second half to tie the score and after two unsuccessful field goal attempts by Notre Dame, the game ended in a tie.  Simpson was held to 55 net rushing yards, his lowest output of the season. The Irish finished with a fifth-place ranking with a 7–2–1 record, while the Trojans would lose to the eventual national champion Ohio State in the Rose Bowl.  It marked the last season of self-imposed bowl abstinence for Notre Dame.

1969 – USC 14, Notre Dame 14  For the second straight year, the Irish tied the Trojans.  Notre Dame came into this game at 3–1, having lost to Purdue and their quarterback, Mike Phipps, while USC was undefeated.  After a scoreless first half, the Irish scored first, but the Trojans took a 14–7 lead in the fourth quarter.  Notre Dame tied it after blocking a USC punt deep in their own territory.  As was the case a year earlier, the Irish missed a field goal late in the game that would have put them ahead.  USC would finish 10–0–1 with a Rose Bowl win over Michigan while Notre Dame would make its first bowl appearance in 45 years, losing to eventual national champion Texas in the Cotton Bown in a 21–17 thriller.

1970 – USC 38, Notre Dame 28  Notre Dame was 9–0 and ranked #2 behind Texas, whom they would face in a rematch in the Cotton Bowl Classic, while USC was 5–4–1.  In one of the most remarkable performances in college football history, Heisman Trophy runner-up Joe Theismann set a still-standing single game school record with 526 passing yards – in a losing effort. The fact that the game was played in a torrential downpour made Theismann's feat that much more amazing.  Down 24–14 at the half, two fumbles, one in their own end zone, proved costly for the Irish, as the Trojans extended their lead to 38–14. Notre Dame came back to within ten early in the fourth quarter, but would not get any closer.  They would go on to end Texas's 30-game winning streak with a 24–11 victory in the Cotton Bowl.

1972 – USC 45, Notre Dame 23  USC was 10–0 and ranked #1, fielding what was arguably their best squad in school history while the Irish were 8–1 and Orange Bowl-bound.  Trojan tailback Anthony Davis did the most damage, scoring six touchdowns including two kickoff returns that went the distance. The Trojans went on to rout Ohio State in the Rose Bowl and to claim the national championship while Notre Dame would suffer its worst defeat under coach Ara Parseghian against Nebraska in the Orange Bowl, 40–6.

1973 – Notre Dame 23, USC 14  Notre Dame was 5–0. while the Trojans were 5–0–1. Anthony Davis was a marked man all day, managing only 55 yards rushing. Eric Penick's 85-yard touchdown run early in the third quarter was the key play of the game. Notre Dame's defense set the tone on the first play of the game when Trojan quarterback Pat Haden attempted a swing pass to Lynn Swann, who was hit so hard by freshman Luther Bradley that his helmet flew off. Bradley's interception late in the game sealed the victory, only the third for Ara Parseghian against the Trojans. The Irish would proceed to run the table and stake their claim to the national championship after a thrilling 24–23 win over Alabama in the Sugar Bowl.

1974 – USC 55, Notre Dame 24 "The Comeback"  In one of the most notable comebacks in college football history, the 1974 Trojans erased a 24-point deficit to beat defending national champion Notre Dame, 55–24, in the Coliseum. Many football historians cite this game as one of USC's 10 greatest games. The Irish jumped out to a 24–0 lead, but with 10 seconds remaining before halftime, Anthony Davis scored on a 7-yard pass from Pat Haden. At the start of second half, Davis took the opening kickoff and raced 102 yards for a score, opening the floodgates as USC rallied for 35 points in the third quarter. Davis scored 2 more touchdowns that quarter, and Haden threw two TD passes to J. K. McKay, the head coach's son. In the fourth quarter, Haden connected with Shelton Diggs for a touchdown and Charles Phillips returned an interception 58 yards for a touchdown. Adding to the shock of the comeback was the fact that USC scored 55 points in under 17 minutes. After the game, the Rev. Theodore Martin Hesburgh, the then-president of Notre Dame, said to Trojan coach John McKay, "That wasn't very nice." McKay, an Irish Catholic known for his quick wit, replied (referring to Parseghian's faith), "That's what you get for hiring a Presbyterian!" A few weeks later, Ara Parseghian announced his resignation, and the Irish gave him a fitting farewell present with an emotional 13–11 win over Alabama and Bear Bryant in the Orange Bowl.

1975 – USC 24, Notre Dame 17  Notre Dame came into this game at 5–1, losing only to Michigan State, while USC was 6–0 and ranked third in the country.  Joe Montana made his first start at quarterback for Notre Dame, having engineered two fourth-quarter comeback victories in as many weeks against North Carolina and Air Force.  Al Hunter's 52-yard touchdown run gave the Irish an early lead. The extra point was missed, and the lead stayed at 6–0. After USC subsequently took a 7–6 lead, Notre Dame blocked a punt and returned it for an apparent touchdown, but the play was nullified by a penalty. Undaunted, the Irish blocked the punt a second time and also returned it for a touchdown. The play stood, and after a successful two-point conversion, the Irish were back in front, 14–7. They took a 17–14 lead into the fourth quarter, but USC would score ten unanswered points to put it away. Following the game Trojans coach John McKay announced he would jump to the NFL expansion Tampa Bay Buccaneers the following season. The Trojans would lose their last four regular season games en route to an 8–4 campaign while the Irish would finish 8–3 with no bowl game.

1977 – Notre Dame 49, USC 19 "The Green Jersey Game"  Dan Devine entered his third year as the Irish head coach, while coach John Robinson was in his second year at USC following the departure of John McKay to the NFL. Notre Dame sat at 4–1, with an upset loss coming to unranked Ole Miss in the second game of the season. Patience was running thin with Irish fans who considered Devine's consecutive 8–3 and 9–3 seasons as lackluster compared to what they were accustomed to with coach Ara Parseghian. The loss to Ole Miss only served to fuel the fire. Devine needed a win against the 5–1 Trojans, whose only blemish was a 1-point loss to Alabama. Little did anyone know that Devine had something special in mind for the game. During Pregame warmups, the Irish players wore their traditional navy blue jerseys.  Following their warmups, they went into the locker room and found co-captains Terry Eurick and Willie Fry clad in emerald green jerseys. A similar green jersey sat in each player's locker. The players quickly returned to the field, followed by a Trojan Horse, containing students dressed as Notre Dame players, but wearing blue jerseys, being dragged by students wearing togas. The sight of the team wearing green sent the crowd at Notre Dame Stadium into a frenzy that would carry on through the entire game.  Quarterback Joe Montana led the Irish offense to a quick 7–0 lead, but the USC linebacker Mario Celloto tied the score on a five-yard fumble return. After several missed field goals, Montana led the offense on a quarterback sneak, and directed the Irish to 28 unanswered points, including two touchdown passes to All-American tight end Ken MacAfee. Ted Burgmeier proved to be an unsung hero.  In the second quarter alone, the senior defensive back intercepted a Rob Hertel pass that would have been a sure Trojan touchdown, executed a fake field goal to perfection and turned a botched snap on a point after touchdown into a successful two-point conversion when he lofted a pass to halfback Tom Domin, who made a spectacular catch as he was falling down across the sideline, yet still managed to keep both feet in bounds.  While the game was quite sloppy, with both teams combining for 10 turnovers, USC could not find the end zone until the 4th quarter. Notre Dame went on to win the game and wore the green jerseys all the way to a victory over Texas in the Cotton Bowl Classic and captured the National Championship.

1978 – USC 27, Notre Dame 25  Notre Dame came into the game with an 8–2 record, having won eight straight after dropping their first two games and was headed to the Cotton Bowl Classic.  For three quarters, USC moved the ball at will and was overwhelming the Irish. Trailing 24–6, Irish quarterback Joe Montana found his touch in the fourth quarter and led a spectacular comeback which saw Notre Dame take a 25–24 lead with 45 seconds remaining. Notre Dame went for two after the go ahead touchdown but was stopped; this would prove critical. In the ensuing series, Notre Dame recovered an apparent fumble by Trojan quarterback Paul McDonald, but it was ruled an incomplete pass.  Given new life, the Trojans moved into field goal range, and with four seconds left, Frank Jordan drilled the game winner for a 27–25 win. USC would go on to beat Michigan in the Rose Bowl and share the national title with Alabama (who they beat 24–14 early in the season in Birmingham).  Montana would work his magic one last time in the 1979 Cotton Bowl Classic.

1979 – USC 42, Notre Dame 23  Notre Dame was 4–1, while USC came into this game at 5–0–1. Both teams would accumulate over 500 yards of total offense apiece as the Trojans pulled away in the second half after being tied 7–7 after 30 minutes. Heisman Trophy winner Charles White accounted for 261 rushing yards on 44 carries.

1980 – USC 20, Notre Dame 3  Notre Dame entered this game at 9–0–1 and headed for a matchup against Georgia in the Sugar Bowl and a shot at a national championship.  They came out flat and sputtered offensively all afternoon.  Trojan tailback Marcus Allen didn't play because of an eye injury.  This was the final regular season game for Irish coach Dan Devine, who announced in August that he would be leaving Notre Dame at season's end.  Notre Dame would subsequently lose to Georgia in the Sugar Bowl and finish 9–2–1.

1982 – USC 17, Notre Dame 13  The Trojans pulled this one out in the closing seconds in what was Trojan coach John Robinson's last game in his first stint with the team; he had stated that he wanted his players to, "win one for the fat guy." Michael Harper appeared to have fumbled before crossing the goal line and despite the fact that Notre Dame recovered the ball, the touchdown stood.  Notre Dame finished 6–4–1 for the season, losing their last three games, while the Trojans, on probation and not going to a bowl, wound up 8–3.

1983–95 – Notre Dame's "Decade of Dominance"
From 1983 to 1993, Notre Dame entered an unprecedented run of success in the series, beating USC 11 straight times. Including a 1994 tie, USC did not beat Notre Dame until 1996, going 13 years without a win. Despite the one-sided nature of the series during this time period, the rivalry still produced several memorable games, including the series' first and only #1 vs #2 matchup to date.

Notable Games:

1983 – Notre Dame 27, USC 6  Notre Dame began an undefeated streak against USC which did not end until 1996. Coach Gerry Faust pulled out all the stops in an effort to halt a five-game slide for the Irish in the series. As in the 1977 "green jersey" game, when Coach Dan Devine had the Irish warm up in traditional blue, then come out of the tunnel in Irish Green jerseys, Faust did the same in this game.

1985 – Notre Dame 37, USC 3  Notre Dame head coach Gerry Faust had his team switch to green jerseys during halftime with the Irish leading, 24–0.

1986 – Notre Dame 38, USC 37  Trailing 37–20 in the fourth quarter, the Irish staged a furious rally to win the game on John Carney's 19-yard field goal as time expired in Lou Holtz's first season as head coach. More officiating controversy as USC appeared to have a first down on a 4th and 1 play deep in Notre Dame territory while leading 37–27. But the officials did not award forward progress, and then hastily flagged USC QB Rodney Peete for unsportsmanlike conduct when he threw his arms up in disgust at where the ball was marked.  It wasn't enough to prevent a losing season, as Notre Dame finished 5–6, but this game marked a turning point in the program, laying the cornerstone for the team's 1988 national championship. It was also a breakout game for future Heisman Trophy Winner Tim Brown.

1987 – Notre Dame 26, USC 15  Notre Dame entered this game at 4–1 while USC was 4–2. After the Trojans scored a quick touchdown on their first possession, the Irish unleashed an overpowering running attack that would net 351 rushing yards. USC would not score again until the closing seconds.

1988 – Notre Dame 27, USC 10 – #1 vs #2
For the first time in this storied series, both teams entered the game undefeated and ranked number one and two respectively. In a controversial move, coach Lou Holtz took his 10–0 Irish squad to L.A. without stars Ricky Watters and Tony Brooks, whom he suspended for disciplinary reasons. The USC Trojans were also undefeated under head coach Larry Smith and standout quarterback Rodney Peete. The Irish came into the game as underdogs, but the spectacular play of defensive end Frank Stams and cornerback Stan Smagala aided the Irish offense, led by Tony Rice, in capturing another Irish victory. Notre Dame went on to capture the National Championship that year, beating West Virginia in the Fiesta Bowl. The sellout crowd of 93,829 was the largest in this rivalry since 1955.

1989 – Notre Dame 28, USC 24  Notre Dame was ranked #1 with an 18-game winning streak. The game was marred by a brawl in the tunnel before the start of the contest. Once it began, it was a thriller. USC quarterback Todd Marinovich completed 33 of 55 passes and staked the Trojans to a 17–7 halftime lead. The Irish fought back in the second half with Tony Rice scoring the winning TD on a keeper, then Notre Dame's defense held off one last Trojan thrust.

1995 – Notre Dame 38, USC 10  USC came into the game, played in October, undefeated and ranked #5, while Notre Dame was ranked #17. Riding a six-game win streak with dominating wins over #25 Arizona and conference opponent Arizona State, it was USC's best start to their football season since 1988. The Irish, however, had other ideas, and the defense held USC to 10 points, including a spectacular forced fumble on the goal line by Irish linebacker Kinnon Tatum. USC went on to lose the game but would finish at 9–2–1 with a Rose Bowl title, while Notre Dame finished 9–3. It would be Holtz's last victory against USC, as USC would finally end its woes against the Irish the following year.

1996–2001
For a six-year period, USC and Notre Dame went .500 against each other, with Southern California winning the first three games and Notre Dame winning the last three. The 2001 Notre Dame victory was also their last until their 2010 defeat of the Trojans.

Notable games:
1996 – USC 27, Notre Dame 20  After 11 straight years of losses and 13 straight years without beating Notre Dame, the Trojans finally defeated the Irish.  USC was struggling at 5–6 after a wild double-overtime loss to UCLA the previous week. while Notre Dame was standing tall with an 8–2 record. and a New Year's Day bowl bid in the works. The Trojans managed to stay in the game despite playing without starting quarterback Brad Otton for large portions of the game due to injury. When Notre Dame scored a touchdown to go ahead 20–12 (with the PAT pending) in the fourth quarter, things looked bleak for USC. But Irish kicker Jim Sanson missed the extra point and the margin stayed at eight. The Trojans responded with an eight-play, 67-yard drive culminating in Delon Washington's 15-yard touchdown run with 1:50 remaining. Washington also ran in the two-point conversion and the score was tied at 20. Neither team could score before the end of regulation and overtime ensued. On USC's first drive, Otton passed to Rodney Sermons for a five-yard touchdown pass and the Trojans went ahead for the first time, 27–20. Jubilation erupted in the Coliseum when Mark Cusano batted down Ron Powlus' fourth-down pass for a Trojan victory.  It was Lou Holtz's last game as coach of the Irish and his first loss to the Trojans.  It was also the first overtime game in the series. Holtz compiled a 9–1–1 record against USC.

1998 – USC 10, Notre Dame 0  USC came into this matchup at 7–4 under first-year coach Paul Hackett while Notre Dame was 9–1 and hoping to secure a major bowl bid with a victory.  Their chances were dealt a severe blow the previous week when quarterback Jarious Jackson suffered a knee injury on the last play of the game against LSU, sidelining him for the USC game.  Without Jackson, the Irish offense was powerless, suffering their first shutout in this series since 1962.  They had to settle for the Gator Bowl, losing to Georgia Tech.

This was the first game in the rivalry not attended by USC "superfan" Giles Pellerin, who had died the previous week during the USC–UCLA game. He had attended every USC game, home and away, since 1925.

1999 – Notre Dame 25, USC 24 In an otherwise dismal season by the Irish, Notre Dame overcame a 21-point deficit to beat the Trojans 25–24 at Notre Dame stadium. The game winner came in one of many lucky breaks, with tight end Jabari Halloway recovering a Jarious Jackson fumble in the end zone with 2:40 remaining on the game clock. The Irish also had the wind at their backs in both the third and fourth quarters, helping the Irish kickers with field position and field goal attempts. It marked the first time since 1996 that Notre Dame beat USC.

2000 – Notre Dame 38, USC 21 The Irish secured their first BCS bowl berth in history by knocking off the Trojans.

2001 – Notre Dame 27, USC 16 After an 0–3 start, the first in school history, Bob Davie's squad managed a win against USC in South Bend. It was the last win the Irish recorded against USC until 2010.  Until 2009, the Irish were the only team to have beaten a Pete-Carroll-coached Trojan squad by more than seven points.

2002–09 – USC's Dominance
From 2002 – 2009, USC defeated Notre Dame eight straight times, in some games winning in a lopsided fashion unprecedented in the series. Despite the one-sided nature of this stretch, the series still produced a classic game in 2005.

Notable Games:

2002 – USC 44, Notre Dame 13
This game reestablished USC on a national level after a decade-long absence from the elite ranks. The Trojans had not played in such a high-stakes game since the 1988 No. 1 vs. No. 2 loss to the Irish. The victory for the Trojans helped them clinch their first-ever BCS bowl berth and established Trojan quarterback Carson Palmer as a Heisman Trophy candidate, which he eventually won. The game culminated USC's most successful season since 1979. A capacity crowd and a national television audience saw USC quarterback Carson Palmer throw for 425 yards and four touchdowns—then Notre Dame opponent records. Palmer led the Trojan offense to 610 total yards, the most yards ever against the Irish. Notre Dame briefly took a 13–10 lead, but Palmer led the Trojans on a 75-yard drive in just over a minute culminating in a pass that sailed over the outstretched hands of two Irish defenders and into the waiting arms of Mike Williams for a 19-yard touchdown. The Trojans sprinted into the locker room with a 17–13 halftime lead and never looked back. USC's 44 points were the most against the Irish by a USC team since Troy's 55–24 victory in 1974.

2005 – USC 34, Notre Dame 31 "The Bush Push" 

After beating the Irish by 31 points each of the past three years, the Trojans came into South Bend to meet Notre Dame and first-year head coach Charlie Weis. The Irish players entered the stadium before the game wearing green jerseys, and put the crowd into a frenzy. A close game throughout, the Irish took the lead with two minutes left on a Brady Quinn touchdown run.  The Trojans stormed back after a 4th and 9 pass by Matt Leinart to Dwayne Jarrett that brought the ball inside the ND 15-yard line. As Leinart scrambled and tried to dive into the end zone, he was hit hard short of the goal line, and the ball was knocked out of bounds with seven seconds to go. However, the clock continued to count down, and after it hit zero, the Irish fans began to storm the field. There was no replay in this game, at the request of coach Pete Carroll, but after huddling, the officials spotted the ball on the one-yard line and put seven seconds back on the clock. On the next play, instead of spiking the ball and kicking a field goal to secure a tie that would have resulted in overtime, the Trojan offense surprised the Irish by running the ball. Trojan running back Reggie Bush pushed Matt Leinart into the end zone. Although this was against the rules at that time, the referees awarded USC the winning touchdown. Weis said he would hope his running back would make a play like that in a similar situation. The Trojans went on to lose to the Texas Longhorns in the BCS Championship Game. 

In 2010, USC was sanctioned by the NCAA for displaying a lack of institutional control for its football, men's basketball and women's tennis programs. As a result, all USC football victories from December 2004 through the 2005 season were vacated, including this classic game.  These sanctions have been criticized by some NCAA football writers, including ESPN's Ted Miller, who wrote, "It's become an accepted fact among informed college football observers that the NCAA sanctions against USC were a travesty of justice, and the NCAA's refusal to revisit that travesty are a massive act of cowardice on the part of the organization."

2007 – USC 38, Notre Dame 0
This was the largest margin of victory the Trojans have put forth on the Irish. It was also their first shutout against them since 1998. USC came into this game 5–1, while Notre Dame came in 1–6. Notre Dame head coach Charlie Weis announced during that summer that his team would wear throwback green jerseys for the matchup, signifying the 30-year anniversary of the Irish beating the Trojans in their green jerseys in 1977, when Weis was a senior at Notre Dame. Because of John David Booty's injured finger, USC backup quarterback Mark Sanchez, was the starter. In his second game as a starter, Sanchez managed to complete 21 of 38 passes with a combined total of 235 yards and 4 touchdown passes. This was the Trojans' 6th consecutive victory over the Irish as well. In the process, they became only the third team to accomplish this feat (Michigan and Michigan State share the record with eight straight wins in non consecutive years).

2010–Present
After eight straight victories by USC, the 2010s were a period of relative dominance by Notre Dame, as the Irish won 7 out of 10 games after Pete Carroll left USC to become the head coach of the Seattle Seahawks. While USC had four different coaches during the 2010s, Brian Kelly was the Irish's head coach for the entire decade.

Notable Games:

2010 – Notre Dame 20, USC 16
For the first time since 1941, both teams faced each other with first-year head coaches – who had never met and did not know each other.  With the Irish coming off of two stellar performances against #14 Utah and Army (27–3 at Yankee Stadium), Notre Dame was riding high, while USC was one week removed from one of their most one-sided defeats in the last decade, a 36–7 loss to the Oregon State Beavers and would be starting fifth-year senior and backup QB Mitch Mustain for the first time due to an injury to starter Matt Barkley. Three key touchdown drives all taking place in the last three minutes of either half and a dropped pass by Ronald Johnson with a little over a minute remaining in the game led the Irish to their first victory over USC since 2001.  They would go on to defeat Miami in the Sun Bowl and finish 8–5 under new coach Brian Kelly.

2011 – USC 31, Notre Dame 17
USC defeated Notre Dame on the road for an unprecedented fifth straight win in South Bend. It was the first night game played in South Bend in 21 years. The turning point came in the third quarter.  Down, 17–10, Notre Dame drove all the way to the USC 1-yard-line and were poised to tie the score when a fumbled snap from center was returned the other way for a touchdown by USC's Jawanza Starling to make it 24–10.  For the game, Notre Dame debuted a shiny gold helmet. Nearly 50 recruits attended the game.

2012 – Notre Dame 22, USC 13
Going into the game, the teams found themselves in an unforeseen reversal of preseason expectations. Notre Dame was ranked #1 in the AP poll after being unranked in that poll to start the season, while USC entered the game unranked after starting the season as the preseason #1 team. With a balanced offensive attack and several late goal-line stands on defense, Notre Dame won the game 22–13. The Irish held on to their #1 BCS ranking and propelled themselves to the BCS Championship Game in Miami. With more than 16 million viewers, it was the most-watched regular-season college football game on ABC since 2006 and the most-viewed ABC Saturday night game ever.  Notre Dame vacated this win in 2016 after "the NCAA determined that a Notre Dame trainer committed academic misconduct for two football players and provided six other players with extra benefits;" the NCAA identified one player who was ineligible for every game in the 2012 season, and another player who was ineligible for every game in the 2013 season.

2014 – USC 49, Notre Dame 14
Both teams were ranked in the preseason, with USC at #15 in both the AP and Coaches Polls while Notre Dame was #17 in both polls.  Going into the game, both teams were unranked with identical 7–4 records.  With a 49–14 victory, USC scored its highest points in the series in 40 years (#6 USC's 55–24 victory over #5 Notre Dame in 1974) and the highest score by either team in the series in 37 years (#11 Notre Dame's 49–19 victory over #5 USC in 1977).  USC Quarterback Cody Kessler threw six touchdown passes, the first time in Notre Dame history that any team had ever made six touchdown passes against the Irish.

2018 – Notre Dame 24, USC 17
The Fighting Irish flew into Los Angeles for this Thanksgiving-weekend game undefeated and ranked #3 in the country. The Trojans were 5–6, and still had a chance at a bowl game bid. The underdog Trojan hosts gave their Fighting Irish guests a scare in the early going by taking a 10–0 lead.  However, Notre Dame got the offense going late in the second quarter, and quarterback Ian Book led his team to 24 unanswered points.  He completed 22 of 39 passes for 352 yards. The Trojans' true freshman quarterback JT Daniels completed 7 out of 10 passes in a late drive which culminated in a 20-yard  touchdown pass to Tyler Vaughns with 48 seconds left. But, the subsequent onside kick failed and Notre Dame ran the clock out to complete an undefeated regular season.

Trophy: Jeweled Shillelagh

The Jeweled Shillelagh (shi-LAY-lee) is the trophy awarded to the winner of the annual Notre Dame–USC football rivalry game.  The shillelagh, an Irish club, is made of oak or blackthorn saplings from Ireland.  On the end of the club is engraved the following: From the Emerald Isle.  The trophy was introduced in 1952 to commemorate the first game in the series played on December 4, 1926.  The trophy was donated by the Notre Dame Alumni Club of Los Angeles, stating that "this shillelagh will serve to symbolize in part the high tradition, the keen rivalry, and above all the sincere respect which these two great universities have for each other."

For each victory, a respective jeweled ornament is added to the foot-long club.  For each USC victory, a ruby-adorned Trojan head is added, marked with the year and game score; for each Notre Dame victory, a similarly detailed emerald-studded shamrock is added.  For tie games, a combined Trojan head/shamrock medallion is used (in 1996 NCAA changed the rules to allow for overtime and thus no more ties are possible).  Although the shillelagh was introduced in 1952, the medallions go back to the start of the series in 1926.  In 1996, after USC defeated Notre Dame for the first time in 14 years, Notre Dame did not turn over the shillelagh, stating that it had run out of space for the Trojan heads and shamrocks after the 1989 game.  The original shillelagh was retired in a 1995 ceremony and is now permanently displayed at Notre Dame.  Instead, Jim Gillis, former head of the Notre Dame Club of Los Angeles, commissioned a second shillelagh, longer than the original and handcrafted from a blackthorn in County Leitrim with gold and jeweled medallions made by Images Jewelers of Elkhart, Indiana.

Game results

In popular culture
 When Michael Corleone visits Miami in The Godfather Part II, Hyman Roth is listening to the 1958 Notre Dame vs. USC game.
 The security guard in the movie Die Hard is watching a football game between Notre Dame and USC. However, the film takes place on Christmas Eve, a day on which the two teams have never met.
 An episode of American Gladiators featured a competition between star USC players Anthony Davis and Charles White and Notre Dame stars Allen Pinkett and Vagas Ferguson.
 In an episode on the third season of The Sopranos, Tony Soprano has a flashback to his childhood where Notre Dame vs. USC is playing on TV. The Notre Dame Victory March is played in this scene.
 A 2008 episode of Family Feud featured competition between the two schools.
 The November 22, 2017 episode of The Price Is Right featured competition between the two schools.

See also
 List of NCAA college football rivalry games

Notes

References

College football rivalries in the United States
USC
USC Trojans football